Henry County is a county located in the U.S. state of Virginia. As of the 2020 census, the population was 50,948. The county seat is usually identified as Martinsville; however, the administration building (where county offices are located and where the board of supervisors holds meetings), county courthouse, and Henry County Sheriff's Office are located on Kings Mountain Road (SR 174) in Collinsville.The Henry County Adult Detention Center is located on DuPont Road in Martinsville.

Henry County is part of the Martinsville, VA Micropolitan Statistical Area.

History

The county was established in 1777 when it was carved from Pittsylvania County. The new county was initially named Patrick Henry County in honor of Patrick Henry, who was then serving as the first Governor of Virginia, and some of whose relatives had settled in the area. Governor Henry also had a  plantation called "Leatherwood plantation" (for Leatherwood Creek) in the newly named county (where he ended up spending 5 years between his third and fourth gubernatorial terms).

In 1785 the northern part of Patrick Henry County was combined with part of Bedford County to form Franklin County. In 1790, Patrick Henry County was split again: the western part became Patrick County and the rest remained Henry County.

Other notable early settlers included: George Waller, Captain George Hairston and Major John Redd, all of whom were present at the surrender of General Cornwallis at Yorktown; Col. Abram Penn, a native of Amherst County, Virginia, who led his Henry County militia troops with the intention of joining General Nathanael Greene at the Battle of Guilford Courthouse during the Revolutionary War; and Brigadier General Joseph Martin, for whom Martinsville is named. Also prominent were Mordecai Hord, a native of Louisa County and explorer, who lived on his plantation called Hordsville; and Col. John Dillard, born in Amherst County, Virginia in 1751, wounded at the Battle of Princeton during the Revolution, and later a member of the Committee of Safety. Captain Robert Hairston, a noted politician in the Colony of Virginia, owned Marrowbone plantation, commanded a militia company and served as Henry County's first high sheriff.

During the War of 1812, the 64th Virginia Militia, under Captain Graves, was formed in 1815 from Henry County. Benjamin Dyer was a lieutenant, then later a captain, of the 5th company of the 64th Virginia Militia.Private Alexander Hunter Bassett would later work large tobacco plantations in the county, and Wyatt Jarrett. Tavner Hailey (b.1793) of Martinsville became an early pioneer in Tennessee and served in the War of 1812. He was 1st Cpl. in Captain Brice Edward's Company, 64th Regiment, Virginia Militia."

During the American Civil War, the 42nd Virginia Infantry was formed in part from Henry County volunteers. Its state senator, Christopher Y. Thomas, owned Henry's former Leatherwood plantation and would later briefly serve in the U.S. House of Representatives after the war. He was succeeded by George Cabell, a Confederate army veteran (38th Virginia Infantry) born in nearby Danville and from a family long prominent in the area.

In 1902, the Henry County Historical Society was incorporated at Martinsville with its first officers being John W. Carter, J. Harrison Spencer and C. B. Bryant.

Geography

Districts
The county's six districts are as follows, in alphabetical order: Axton, Bassett, Collinsville, Horsepasture, Reed Creek, and Ridgeway.

Adjacent counties
 Franklin County, Virginia - north
 Pittsylvania County, Virginia - east
 Rockingham County, North Carolina - south
 Stokes County, North Carolina - southwest
 Patrick County, Virginia - west
 Martinsville - surrounded by Henry County

Major highways
  (future)

Demographics

2020 census

Note: the US Census treats Hispanic/Latino as an ethnic category. This table excludes Latinos from the racial categories and assigns them to a separate category. Hispanics/Latinos can be of any race.

2000 Census
As of the census of 2000, there were 57,930 people, 23,910 households, and 16,952 families residing in the county.  The population density was 152 people per square mile (58/km2).  There were 25,921 housing units at an average density of 68 per square mile (26/km2).  The racial makeup of the county was 89.47% White, 10% Black or African American, 0.16% Native American, 0.41% Asian, 0.03% Pacific Islander, 1.39% from other races, and 0.92% from two or more races.  3.46% of the population were Hispanic or Latino of any race.

There were 23,910 households, out of which 28.60% had children under the age of 18 living with them, 54.30% were married couples living together, 12.20% had a female householder with no husband present, and 29.10% were non-families. 25.80% of all households were made up of individuals, and 10.30% had someone living alone who was 65 years of age or older.  The average household size was 2.40 and the average family size was 2.87.

In the county, the population was spread out, with 22.30% under the age of 18, 7.50% from 18 to 24, 29.00% from 25 to 44, 26.10% from 45 to 64, and 15.00% who were 65 years of age or older.  The median age was 39 years. For every 100 females, there were 95.10 males.  For every 100 females age 18 and over, there were 93.00 males.

The median income for a household in the county was $31,816, and the median income for a family was $38,649. Males had a median income of $26,660 versus $20,766 for females. The per capita income for the county was $17,110.  About 8.80% of families and 11.70% of the population were below the poverty line, including 15.20% of those under age 18 and 12.60% of those age 65 or over.

Government

Board of supervisors
 Blackberry District: Jimmie L. "Jim" Adams (I)
 Collinsville District: Joe Bryant (I)
 Horsepasture District: Debra Parsons Buchanan (I)
 Iriswood District: Garrett Dillard (I)
 Reed Creek District: T.J. "Tommy" Slaughter (I)
 Ridgeway District: Ryan Zehr (I)

Constitutional officers
 Clerk of the Circuit Court: Jennifer Ashworth (I)
 Commissioner of the Revenue: Linda N. Love (I)
 Commonwealth's Attorney: Andrew Nester (I)
 Sheriff: Lane A. Perry (I)
 Treasurer: Scott B. Grindstaff (I)
 General Registrar: Dawn Stutz-Vaughn

Henry County is represented by Republican William M. "Bill" Stanley in the Virginia Senate, Republicans Wren Williams, D.W. "Danny" Marshall III, and Les R. Adams in the Virginia House of Delegates, and Republicans Bob Good and H. Morgan Griffith in the U.S. House of Representatives.

Communities

As an independent city since 1928, Martinsville is not part of Henry County, but exists as an enclave, surrounded by the county.

Town
 Ridgeway

Census-designated places

 Bassett
 Chatmoss
 Collinsville
 Fieldale
 Horsepasture
 Laurel Park
 Oak Level
 Sandy Level
 Stanleytown
 Villa Heights

Other unincorporated communities
 Axton
 Preston
 Spencer

Notable people
 Ward Armstrong
 Alexander Hunter Bassett
 John D. Bassett
 John Breathitt
 Thomas G. Burch
 H. Clay Earles
 Patrick Henry
 Jeff Hensley
 Jimmy Hensley
 J. C. Martin
 Joseph Martin (general)
 Otis Martin
 Barry Michaels
 Shawn Moore
 Abram Penn
 A. L. Philpott
 Carr Waller Pritchett Sr.
 Robert Hairston
 Rodney Sawyers
 Jessamine Shumate
 Thomas B. Stanley
 John H. Traylor
 Christopher Thomas
 Anne Spencer

See also
 Henry County Sheriff's Office
 National Register of Historic Places listings in Henry County, Virginia

References

External links
 Henry County, Official site
 Henry County Public Schools
 Patrick Henry Monument, Henry County, Virginia, virginia.org
 Henry County – The Carolina Road, Wilderness Road, virginia.org
 Architectural Survey of Henry County/Martinsville, Virginia, Martinsville-Henry County Historical Society

 
Virginia counties
1777 establishments in Virginia
Populated places established in 1777
Martinsville, Virginia micropolitan area
Counties of Appalachia